The 1992 European motorcycle Grand Prix was the sixth round of the 1992 Grand Prix motorcycle racing season. It took place on the weekend of 29–31 May 1992 at the Montmelò circuit.

500 cc race report

Mick Doohan was on pole. At the start John Kocinski briefly got the lead however Eddie Lawson beat him to the first turn. Lawson, Doohan and Wayne Rainey were at the front. Doohan got past Lawson, as did Rainey. With 2 laps to go, Rainey got past Doohan. Doohan tried to repass, but Rainey denied him any opportunities.

500 cc classification

References

European motorcycle Grand Prix
European
European Motorcycle